Guédé Noah Nadje (born 12 November 2003) is a French professional footballer who plays as a forward for Angers II.

Career 
Nadje made his professional debut for Angers SCO on the 26 January 2022, replacing Angelo Fulgini during a 1–0 away Ligue 1 loss against Saint-Etienne.

Personal life
Born in France, Nadje is of Ivorian descent.

References

External links

2003 births
Living people
People from Saint-Maurice, Val-de-Marne
French sportspeople of Ivorian descent
French footballers
Footballers from Val-de-Marne
Association football forwards
Ligue 1 players
Championnat National 2 players
Angers SCO players